is a Shinto shrine in Miki, Hyōgo Prefecture, Japan. It is a Hachiman Shrine that was founded in 1111 and was rebuilt in 1585 after having burned down.

Events
Third Sunday in January: Oni-oi Shiki.
Second and third Saturdays and Sundays in October: Miki Autumn Harvest Festival.

See also
Ōmiya Hachiman Shrine (Tokyo)

References

Location
This shrine is near Miki station on the Ao Line of Kobe Electric Railway.

External links 
Official website

Shinto shrines in Hyōgo Prefecture
Hachiman shrines
Religious buildings and structures completed in 1111